God Made Them... I Kill Them (also known as God Forgives: His Life Is Mine) is a 1968 Italian Spaghetti Western film  written by  Fernando Di Leo  and directed by Paolo Bianchini.

Plot

Cast 

 Dean Reed as Slim Corbett
 Peter Martell as  Don Luis / Rod Douglas 
 Piero Lulli as Sheriff Lancaster 
 Agnès Spaak as  Dolores
 Linda Veras as  Dolly 
 Ivano Staccioli as Judge Kincaid 
 Fidel Gonzáles as  Job  
 Piero Mazzinghi as Major Toland

References

External links

Spanish Western (genre) films
Spaghetti Western films
1968 Western (genre) films
1968 films
Films directed by Paolo Bianchini
1960s Italian films